This was the first edition of the tournament.

Harri Heliövaara and Illya Marchenko won the title after defeating Karol Drzewiecki and Szymon Walków 6–4, 6–4 in the final.

Seeds

Draw

References

External links
 Main draw

Nur-Sultan Challenger - Doubles